DCSA can refer to:

Defense Counterintelligence and Security Agency, a US security agency
Defence Communication Services Agency, a former UK military agency